Dan Bjornlie (born October 17, 1977, in Eagan, Minnesota) is an American former professional ice hockey defenseman who last played competitively with the Vienna Capitals of the Erste Bank Hockey League.

His pro career began with two seasons in the United Hockey League with the Quad City Mallards.  He also played two games in the American Hockey League with the Portland Pirates.  He then moved to Germany, playing in 2nd Bundesliga with SC Riessersee in a two-year spell.  His spell ended after the team was excluded from the league for financial reasons.  He eventually moved to up to the Deutsche Eishockey Liga, the country's top league, playing for the Kölner Haie.  He later returned to the 2nd. Bundesliga with SC Bietigheim-Bissingen.  In 2007, he signed with the Vienna Capitals.

Awards and honors

References

External links

1977 births
American expatriate sportspeople in Austria
American expatriate sportspeople in Germany
American men's ice hockey defensemen
Ice hockey players from Minnesota
Kölner Haie players
Living people
People from Eagan, Minnesota
Portland Pirates players
Quad City Mallards (UHL) players
Vienna Capitals players
Wisconsin Badgers men's ice hockey players
Sportspeople from the Minneapolis–Saint Paul metropolitan area